The Submarine Force, is an armed service of the Vietnam People's Navy which deals with submarine warfare.

The force is made up of 6 Russian made Kilo-class submarines.

Currently, the force consists of a single unit: 189th Submarine Brigade.

History
In 2009, the VPN ordered 6 Kilo-class submarine submarines from Russia. The total value of the contract was 4.3 billion USD. The contract also includes the training of Vietnamese sailors and the construction of a class-1 standard submarine crew training center at Cam Ranh Bay.

On 29 May 2013, the VPN officially established the submarine force and the creation of the 189th Submarine Brigade at Cam Ranh Bay.

Boats

References

 
Submarines of the Vietnam People's Navy